The Student Association at the Umeå School of Business (in Swedish:  Handelshögskolan i Umeå Studentförening, HHUS) is a non-profit-making association and a part of the Umeå Student Union. All students at the Umeå School of Business (USBE) are members in HHUS. Active members work voluntarily to improve the student experience at USBE.

See also
Umeå School of Business

External links
HHUS -official site
USBE

Students' unions in Sweden
Umeå University